The Jiangsu Wantrack International Circuit is a  FIA Grade 4 motorsport circuit in Nanjing, China. The circuit was opened in 2014.

Lap records

The official fastest race lap records at the Jiangsu Wantrack International Circuit are listed as:

Notes

References

FIA Grade 4 circuit
Motorsport venues in Jiangsu
Sports venues completed in 2014
2014 establishments in China